Discinella terrestris is a species of fungus in the family Helotiaceae. It was first described as Helotium terrestre by Miles Joseph Berkeley and Christopher Edmund Broome in 1882, from collections made in Brisbane. R.W.G. Dennis transferred it to the genus Discinella in 1958.

The cylindrical eight-spored asci are borne on long stalks, and measure 200–225 by 10–14 μm; spores are elliptical to spindle-shaped, contains two to four oil droplets, and measure 14–25 by 7.5–9 μm. Paraphyses are shaped like narrow cylinders about 2 μm thick, and have rounded tips. The species is found in Australia, where it grows on the floor of sclerophyllous eucalypt forests.

References

External links

Helotiaceae
Fungi described in 1882
Fungi of Australia
Taxa named by Miles Joseph Berkeley
Taxa named by Christopher Edmund Broome